Mahmoud Eskandari (1950- 2001) was the pilot colonel of the F-4 Phantom 2 Islamic Republic of Iran Air Force. He was active in the Iran–Iraq War and his constant presence in 3 important operations, including the liberation of Khorramshahr, H-3 airstrike and Operation Baghdad. He is considered as one of the most prominent pilots of the Iranian Air Force.

Eskandari managed to recover the damaged plane and return it to Iran in the Baghdad operation after the crash of plane of Abbas Doran due to a missile.

Operations 

 H-3 airstrike (April 6, 1981)
 Liberation of Khorramshahr (May 6, 1982) 
 Battle of Khorramshahr (1982) (July 1982)

References 

Islamic Republic of Iran Air Force personnel
Iranian military personnel of the Iran–Iraq War
Iranian aviators
1950 births
2001 deaths